The Serra do Mar tyrannulet (Phylloscartes difficilis) is a small species of bird in the family Tyrannidae. It is endemic to humid montane forest in the Serra do Mar in south-eastern Brazil. More likely confused with the short-tailed and pale-eyed hangnest tody-tyrant than other members of the genus Phylloscartes, its bright olive-green upperparts contrast strongly with the grey underparts. It is generally uncommon and threatened by habitat loss.

References

Serra do Mar tyrannulet
Birds of the Atlantic Forest
Endemic birds of Brazil
Taxa named by Hermann von Ihering
Taxa named by Rodolpho von Ihering
Serra do Mar tyrannulet
Taxonomy articles created by Polbot